National Secondary Route 134, or just Route 134 (or ) is a National Road Route of Costa Rica, located in the Alajuela province.

Description
In Alajuela province the route covers Atenas canton (Atenas, Concepción districts).

References

Highways in Costa Rica